Kabayan, officially the Municipality of Kabayan, is a 4th class municipality in the province of Benguet, Philippines. According to the 2020 census, it has a population of 15,806 people.

Kabayan is the site of centuries-old Ibaloi mummies buried inside caves scattered around its villages.

The third highest mountain in the Philippines, Mount Pulag, is located in the territorial boundary of the vegetable farming town.

Etymology
The name Kabayan was derived from the term Kaba-ayan, from the Ibaloi word ba-ay, a root crop vine thriving in the place. Most of the early Ibaloi settlements, in the area, which include Eddet and Duacan, were named after grasses in the heavily forested area.

History

Pre-colonial period
The first Ibaloi settlers in Benguet arrived at Imbose (or Embosi), located in present-day Kabayan.

Mummification of the dead was practiced long before Spanish colonizers reached the place.

Spanish period
In the late 1800s, Spanish colonizers reached Kabayan via trails constructed throughout the mountain region. Organized into three rancherias, namely Adaoay, Kabayan, and Lutab (or Dutab), Kabayan was registered under the comandancia politico-militar of Benguet in 1846. Lutab (currently barangay Poblacion or Kabayan Central) was later integrated into the Kabayan rancheria.

The practice of mummification of the dead would be discouraged by the Spaniards, until it would die out.

American period
During the American rule, Kabayan and Adaoay were established as two of the 19 townships of the province of Benguet, upon the issuance of Act No. 48 by the Philippine Commission on November 22, 1900.

On August 13, 1908, Benguet would be established with the enactment of Act No. 1876 as a sub-province of the newly created Mountain Province.  Six townships of Benguet were later abolished, including Adaoay, which was integrated into the township of Kabayan.

Post-war Era
On June 25, 1963, then-President Diosdado Macapagal issued Executive Order No. 42 converting eight (8) of the thirteen (13) towns (designated as municipal districts) of Benguet sub-province into regular municipalities. Kabayan was among them.

On June 18, 1966, the sub-province of Benguet was separated from the old Mountain Province and would be converted into a regular province. Kabayan remained to be a component municipality of the newly established province.

Geography
It is bounded by Buguias on the north, Kibungan on the north-west, Atok on the south-west, Bokod on the south, Kayapa on the southeast, and Tinoc on the north-east.

According to the Philippine Statistics Authority, the municipality has a land area of  constituting  of the  total area of Benguet.

Barangays
Kabayan is politically subdivided into 13 barangays. These barangays are headed by elected officials: Barangay Captain, Barangay Council, whose members are called Barangay Councilors. All are elected every three years.

In the 2010 Census of Population and Housing, Barangay Anchukey would be the least populated barangay in the province of Benguet.

Climate

Demographics

In the 2020 census, Kabayan had a population of 15,806.

Economy

Government
Kabayan, belonging to the lone congressional district of the province of Benguet, is governed by a mayor designated as its local chief executive and by a municipal council as its legislative body in accordance with the Local Government Code. The mayor, vice mayor, and the councilors are elected directly by the people through an election which is being held every three years.

Elected officials

Tourism

Kabayan is best known for the antiquated centuries-old mummies and Mount Pulag, the third highest mountain in the Philippines. The Kabayan mummy burial caves are officially proclaimed Philippine National Cultural Treasures pursuant to Presidential Decree No. 374, and is under consideration as a World Heritage Site. The mummified body of Apo Annu, a tribal leader, was stolen but recovered by an antique collector and was returned to the town. Archaeologists from various countries have visited the town to promote preservation of the mummies due to deterioration of the cadavers. The caves containing the cadavers of these mummies have been declared by Monument Watch as one of the "100 Most Endangered Sites" in the world.

Mount Pulag is a destination for mountaineers, hikers, including picnickers. At its summit, the climbers can see the surroundings of the whole north Luzon.

Education

Public schools
As of 2014, Kabayan has 22 public elementary schools and 3 public secondary schools.

Notes

References

External links

 [ Philippine Standard Geographic Code]

Municipalities of Benguet
Populated places on the Agno River